The 2021–22 Borussia Dortmund II season is the club's first season back in the 3. Liga since their relegation in the 2014–15 season.

Squad

Competitions

Pre-season

3. Liga

League table

Matches 
Source:

References 

Borussia Dortmund II seasons
Borussia Dortmund II